Godunovo is a rural locality (a selo) in Andreyevskoye Rural Settlement, Alexandrovsky District, Vladimir Oblast, Russia. The population was 692 as of 2010. There are 13 streets.

Geography 
Godunovo is located 25 km northeast of Alexandrov (the district's administrative centre) by road. Prechistino is the nearest rural locality.

References 

Rural localities in Alexandrovsky District, Vladimir Oblast
Alexandrovsky Uyezd (Vladimir Governorate)